An urban area, built-up area or urban agglomeration is a human settlement with a high population density and infrastructure of built environment. Urban areas are created through urbanization and are categorized as cities, towns, conurbations or suburbs. In urbanism, the term contrasts to rural areas such as villages and hamlets; in urban sociology or urban anthropology it contrasts with natural environment. The creation of earlier predecessors of urban areas during the urban revolution led to the creation of human civilization with modern urban planning, which along with other human activities such as exploitation of natural resources led to a human impact on the environment. "Agglomeration effects" are in the list of the main consequences of increased rates of firm creation since. This is due to conditions created by a greater level of industrial activity in a given region. However, a favorable environment for human capital development would also be generated simultaneously.

In 1950, around the world, 764 million people lived in urban areas. By 2014, it was 3.9 billion. The change was driven by a combination of increased total population and increased percent of population living in urban areas. In 2009, the number of people living in urban areas (3.42 billion) surpassed the number living in rural areas (3.41 billion), and since then the world has become more urban than rural. This was the first time that the majority of the world's population lived in a city. In 2014 there were 7.3 billion people living on the planet, of which the global urban population comprised 3.9 billion. The Population Division of the United Nations Department of Economic and Social Affairs at that time predicted the urban population would occupy 68% of the world population by 2050, with 90% of that growth coming from Africa and Asia.

Urban areas are created and further developed by the process of urbanization. They are measured for various purposes, including analyzing population density and urban sprawl. Urban areas are also mostly found in the United States, Canada, Brazil, Argentina, Japan and Australia and many other countries where the urbanization rate is over 80%.

Unlike an urban area, a metropolitan area includes not only the urban area, but also satellite cities plus intervening rural land that is socio-economically connected to the urban core city, typically by employment ties through commuting, with the urban core city being the primary labor market.

The concept of an "urban area" as used in economic statistics should not be confused with the concept of the "urban area" used in road safety statistics. This term was first created by Geographer Brian Manning. The last concept is also known as "built-up area in road safety". According to the definition by the Office for National Statistics, "Built-up areas are defined as land which is 'irreversibly urban in character', meaning that they are characteristic of a town or city. Any areas [separated by] less than 200 metres [of non-urban space] are linked to become a single built-up area.

Argentina and Japan are countries where the urbanization rate is over 90% while Australia, Brazil, Canada, Mexico and the United States are countries where the urbanization rate is between 80% and 90%.

Largest urban areas in the world 
 

  Tokyo (Japan) - 37,274,000
  New Delhi (India) - 32,066,000
  Shanghai (China) - 28,517,000
  Manila (Philippines) - 28,250,517
  Dhaka (Bangladesh) - 22,478,000
  São Paulo (Brazil) - 22,430,000
  Mexico City (Mexico) - 22,085,000
  Cairo (Egypt) - 21,750,000
  Beijing (China) - 21,333,000
  Mumbai (India) - 20,961,000

Largest urban areas, by continent

Africa 

  Cairo (Egypt) - 21,750,000
  Kinshasa (DR Congo) - 15,628,000
  Lagos (Nigeria) - 15,388,000
  Johannesburg (South Africa) - 10,110,000
  Luanda (Angola) - 8,952,000
  Dar es Salaam (Tanzania) - 7,405,000
  Khartoum (Sudan) - 6,160,000
  Abidjan (Ivory Coast) - 5,516,000
  Alexandria (Egypt) - 5,484,000
  Addis Ababa (Ethiopia) - 5,228,000

Asia 

  Tokyo (Japan) - 37,274,000
  New Delhi (India) - 32,066,000
  Shanghai (China) - 28,517,000
  Manila (Philippines) - 28,250,517
  Dhaka (Bangladesh) - 22,478,000
  Beijing (China) - 21,333,000
  Mumbai (India) - 20,961,000
  Osaka (Japan) - 19,060,000
  Karachi (Pakistan) - 16,840,000
  Chongqing (China) - 16,875,000

Europe 

  Istanbul (Turkey) - 15,636,000
  Moscow (Russia) - 12,641,000
  Paris (France) - 11,142,000
  London (United Kingdom) - 9,426,000
  Madrid (Spain) - 6,714,000
  Berlin (Germany) - 6,144,600
  Barcelona (Spain) - 5,658,000
  Saint Petersburg (Russia) - 5,536,000
  Rome (Italy) - 4,298,000
  Athens (Greece) - 3,154,000

North America 

  Mexico City (Mexico) - 22,085,000
  New York - Newark (United States) - 18,867,000
  Los Angeles - Long Beach - Santa Ana (United States) - 12,488,000
  Chicago (United States) - 8,901,000
  Houston (United States) - 6,603,000
  Dallas - Fort Worth (United States) - 6,488,400
  Toronto (Canada) - 6,313,000
  Miami (United States) - 6,079,000
  Philadelphia (United States) - 5,705,000
  Washington, D.C. - Baltimore (United States) - 5,434,000

Oceania 

  Melbourne (Australia) - 4,870,000
  Sydney (Australia) - 4,859,000
  Brisbane (Australia) - 2,568,927
  Perth (Australia) - 2,016,000
  Auckland (New Zealand) - 1,582,000
  Adelaide (Australia) - 1,328,000
  Honolulu (United States) - 1,016,000
  Gold Coast (Australia) - 687,000
  Canberra (Australia) - 452,000
  Newcastle (Australia) - 447,000

South America 

  São Paulo (Brazil) - 22,430,000
  Buenos Aires (Argentina) - 15,370,000
  Rio de Janeiro (Brazil) - 13,634,000
  Bogotá (Colombia) - 11,344,000
  Lima - Callao (Peru) - 11,176,000
  Santiago (Chile) - 6,857,000
  Belo Horizonte (Brazil) - 6,194,000
  Brasília (Brazil) - 4,804,000
  Recife (Brazil) - 4,220,000
  Porto Alegre (Brazil) - 4,185,000

Largest urban areas, by country

Afghanistan
4.589 million KABUL (capital) (2023)

Albania
520,000 TIRANA (capital) (2023)

Algeria
2.854 million ALGIERS (capital) ; 922,000 Oran (2022)

American Samoa
49,000 PAGO PAGO (capital) (2018)

Andorra
23,000 ANDORRA LA VELLA (capital) (2018)

Angola
9.292 million LUANDA (capital), 959,000 Lubango, 905,000 Cabinda, 809,000 Benguela, 783,000 Malanje  (2023)

Anguilla
1,000 THE VALLEY (capital) (2018)

Antigua and Barbuda
21,000 SAINT JOHN'S (capital) (2018)

Argentina
15.490 million BUENOS AIRES (capital), 1.612 million Cordoba, 1.594 million Rosario, 1.226 million Mendoza, 1.027 million San Miguel de Tucuman, 914,000 La Plata (2023)

Armenia
1.095 million YEREVAN (capital) (2023)

Aruba
30,000 ORANJESTAD (capital) (2018)

Australia
5.235 million Melbourne, 5.121 million Sydney, 2.505 million Brisbane, 2.118 million Perth, 1.367 million Adelaide, 472,000 CANBERRA (capital) (2023)

Austria
1.975 million VIENNA (capital) (2023)

Azerbaijan
2.432 million BAKU (capital) (2023)

Bahamas, The
280,000 NASSAU (capital) (2018)

Bahrain
689,000 MANAMA (capital) (2022)

Bangladesh
23.210 million DHAKA (capital), 5.380 million Chittagong, 955,000 Khulna, 962,000 Rajshahi, 969,000 Rangpur, 964,000 Sylhet, 906,000 Bogra (2023)

Barbados
89,000 BRIDGETOWN (capital) (2018)

Belarus
2.049 million MINSK (capital) (2022)

Belgium
2.110 million BRUSSELS (capital); 1.053 million Antwerp (2022)

Belize
23,000 BELMOPAN (capital) (2018)

Benin
285,000 PORTO-NOVO (capital) (2018) ; 1.189 million Abomey-Calavi ; 709,000 COTONOU (seat of government) (2022)

Bermuda
10,000 HAMILTON (capital) (2018)

Bhutan
203,000 THIMPHU (capital) (2018)

Bolivia
1.908 million LA PAZ (capital) ; 1.784 million Santa Cruz ; 1.369 million Cochabamba ; 278,000 Sucre (constitutional capital) (2022)

Bosnia and Herzegovina
344,000 SARAJEVO (capital) (2022)

Botswana
269,000 GABORONE (capital) (2018)

Brazil
22.620 million Sao Paulo, 13.728 million Rio de Janeiro, 6.248 million Belo Horizonte, 4.873 million BRASILIA (capital), 4.264 million Recife, 4.212 million Porto Alegre (2023)

British Virgin Islands
15,000 ROAD TOWN (capital) (2018)

Brunei
241,000 BANDAR SERI BEGAWAN (capital) (2011)

Bulgaria
1.287 million SOFIA (capital) (2022)

Burkina Faso
3.056 million OUAGADOUGOU (capital) ; 1.074 million Bobo-Dioulasso (2022)

Burundi
1.139 million BUJUMBURA (capital) (2022)

Cabo Verde
168,000 PRAIA (capital) (2018)

Cambodia
2.211 million PHNOM PENH (capital) (2022)

Cameroon
4.164 million YAOUNDE (capital) ; 3.927 million Douala (2022)

Canada
6.372 million Toronto, 4.308 million Montreal, 2.657 million Vancouver, 1.640 million Calgary, 1.544 million Edmonton, 1.437 million OTTAWA (capital) (2023)

Cayman Islands
35,000 GEORGE TOWN (capital) (2018)

Central African Republic
933,000 BANGUI (capital) (2022)

Chad
1.533 million N'DJAMENA (capital) (2022)

Chile
6.903 million SANTIAGO (capital), 1.009 million Valparaiso, 912,000 Concepcion (2023)

China
29.211 million Shanghai, 21.766 million BEIJING (capital), 17.341 million Chongqing, 14.284 million Guangzhou, 14.239 million Tianjin, 13.073 million Shenzhen (2023)

Colombia
11.508 million BOGOTA (capital), 4.102 million Medellin, 2.864 million Cali, 2.349 million Barranquilla, 1.381 million Bucaramanga, 1.088 million Cartagena (2023)

Comoros
62,000 MORONI (capital) (2018)

Congo, Democratic Republic of the
16.316 million KINSHASA (capital), 2.892 million Mbuji-Mayi, 2.812 million Lubumbashi, 1.664 million Kananga, 1.423 million Kisangani, 1.249 million Bukavu (2023)

Congo, Republic of the
2.638 million BRAZZAVILLE (capital), 1.336 million Pointe-Noire (2023)

Costa Rica
1.441 million SAN JOSE (capital) (2022)

Cote d'Ivoire
231,000 YAMOUSSOUKRO (capital) (2018) ; 5.516 million ABIDJAN (seat of government) (2022)

Croatia
684,000 ZAGREB (capital) (2022)

Cuba
2.149 million HAVANA (capital) (2023)

Curacao
144,000 WILLEMSTAD (capital) (2018)

Cyprus
269,000 NICOSIA (capital) (2018)

Czech Republic
1.318 million PRAGUE (capital) (2022)

Denmark
1.370 million COPENHAGEN (capital) (2022)

Djibouti
591,000 DJIBOUTI (capital) (2022)

Dominica
15,000 ROSEAU (capital) (2018)

Dominican Republic
3.524 million SANTO DOMINGO (capital) (2023)

Ecuador
3.142 million Guayaquil, 1.957 million QUITO (capital) (2023)

Egypt
22.183 million CAIRO (capital), 5.588 million Alexandria, 778,000 Bur Sa'id (2023)

El Salvador
1.116 million SAN SALVADOR (capital) (2023)

Equatorial Guinea
297,000 MALABO (capital) (2018)

Eritrea
1.073 million ASMARA (capital) (2023)

Estonia
452,000 TALLINN (capital) (2022)

Eswatini
68,000 MBABANE (capital) (2018)

Ethiopia
5.461 million ADDIS ABABA (capital) (2023)

Falkland Islands
2,000 STANLEY (capital) (2018)

Faroe Islands
21,000 TÓRSHAVN (capital) (2018)

Fiji
178,000 SUVA (capital) (2018)

Finland
1.328 million HELSINKI (capital) (2022)

France
11.208 million PARIS (capital), 1.761 million Lyon, 1.628 million Marseille-Aix-en-Provence, 1.079 million Lille, 1.060 million Toulouse, 1.000 million Bordeaux (2023)

French Polynesia
136,000 PAPEETE (capital) (2018)

Gabon
857,000 LIBREVILLE (capital) (2022)

Gambia, The
470,000 BANJUL (capital) (2022)

Georgia
1.203 million TBILISI (capital) (2022)

Germany
3.574 million BERLIN (capital), 1.788 million Hamburg, 1.576 million Munich, 1.144 million Cologne, 796,000 Frankfurt (2023)

Ghana
3.630 million Kumasi ; 2.605 million ACCRA (capital) ; 1.035 million Sekondi Takoradi (2022)

Gibraltar
35,000 GIBRALTAR (capital) (2018)

Greece
3.154 million ATHENS (capital) ; 814,000 Thessaloniki (2022)

Greenland
18,000 NUUK (capital) (2018)

Grenada
39,000 SAINT GEORGE'S (capital) (2018)

Guam
147,000 HAGATNA (capital) (2018)

Guatemala
3.095 million GUATEMALA CITY (capital) (2023)

Guernsey
16,000 SAINT PETER PORT (capital) (2018)

Guinea
2.049 million CONAKRY (capital) (2022)

Guinea-Bissau
643,000 BISSAU (capital) (2022)

Guyana
110,000 GEORGETOWN (capital) (2018)

Haiti
2.915 million PORT-AU-PRINCE (capital) (2022)

Holy See
1,000 VATICAN CITY (capital) (2018)

Honduras
1.568 million TEGUCIGALPA (capital), 982,000 San Pedro Sula (2023)

Hong Kong
7.643 million Hong Kong (2022)

Hungary
1.775 million BUDAPEST (capital) (2022)

Iceland
216,000 REYKJAVÍK (capital) (2018)

India
32.941 million NEW DELHI (capital), 21.297 million Mumbai, 15.333 million Kolkata, 13.608 million Bangalore, 11.776 million Chennai, 10.801 million Hyderabad (2023)

Indonesia
11.249 million JAKARTA (capital), 3.729 million Bekasi, 3.044 million Surabaya, 3.041 million Depok, 2.674 million Bandung, 2.514 million Tangerang (2023)

Iran
9.500 million TEHRAN (capital), 3.368 million Mashhad, 2.258 million Esfahan, 1.721 million Shiraz, 1.661 million Tabriz, 1.594 million Karaj (2023)

Iraq
7.711 million BAGHDAD (capital), 1.792 million Mosul, 1.448 million Basra, 1.075 million Kirkuk, 958,000 Najaf, 897,000 Erbil (2023)

Ireland
1.256 million DUBLIN (capital) (2022)

Isle of Man
27,000 DOUGLAS (capital) (2018)

Israel
4.344 million Tel Aviv-Yafo ; 1.254 million JERUSALEM (capital) ; 1.164 million Haifa (2022)

Italy
4.316 million ROME (capital), 3.155 million Milan, 2.179 million Naples, 1.802 million Turin, 913,000 Bergamo, 850,000 Palermo (2023)

Jamaica
595,000 KINGSTON (capital) (2022)

Japan
37.194 million TOKYO (capital), 19.013 million Osaka, 9.569 million Nagoya, 5.490 million Kitakyushu-Fukuoka, 2.937 million Shizuoka-Hamamatsu, 2.666 million Sapporo (2023)

Jersey
34,000 SAINT HELIER (capital) (2018)

Jordan
2.210 million AMMAN (capital) (2022)

Kazakhstan
1.987 million Almaty, 1.291 million NUR-SULTAN (capital), 1.155 million Shimkent (2023)

Kenya
5.325 million NAIROBI (capital), 1.440 million Mombassa (2023)

Kiribati
64,000 TARAWA (capital) (2018)

Korea, North
3.158 million PYONGYANG (capital) (2023)

Korea, South
9.988 million SEOUL (capital), 3.472 million Busan, 2.849 million Incheon, 2.181 million Daegu (Taegu), 1.577 million Daejon (Taejon), 1.529 million Gwangju (Kwangju) (2023)

Kosovo
216,870 PRISTINA (capital) (2019)

Kuwait
3.298 million KUWAIT (capital) (2023)

Kyrgyzstan
1.105 million BISHKEK (capital) (2023)

Laos
706,000 VIENTIANE (capital) (2022)

Latvia
625,000 RIGA (capital) (2022)

Lebanon
2.433 million BEIRUT (capital) (2022)

Lesotho
350,000 MASERU (capital) (2022)

Liberia
1.623 million MONROVIA (capital) (2022)

Libya
1.183 million TRIPOLI (capital), 984,000 Misratah, 859,000 Benghazi (2023)

Liechtenstein
5,000 VADUZ (capital) (2018)

Lithuania
541,000 VILNIUS (capital) (2022)

Luxembourg
120,000 LUXEMBOURG (capital) (2018)

Madagascar
3.700 million ANTANANARIVO (capital) (2022)

Malawi
1.222 million LILONGWE (capital) ; 995,000 Blantyre-Limbe (2022)

Malaysia
8.622 million KUALA LUMPUR (capital), 1.086 million Johor Bahru, 857,000 Ipoh (2023)

Maldives
177,000 MALE (capital) (2018)

Mali
2.817 million BAMAKO (capital) (2022)

Malta
213,000 VALLETTA (capital) (2018)

Marshall Islands
31,000 MAJURO (capital) (2018)

Mauritania
1.432 million NOUAKCHOTT (capital) (2022)

Mauritius
149,000 PORT LOUIS (capital) (2018)

Mexico
22.281 million MEXICO CITY (capital), 5.420 million Guadalajara, 5.117 million Monterrey, 3.345 million Puebla, 2.626 million Toluca de Lerdo, 2.260 million Tijuana (2023)

Federated States of Micronesia
7,000 PALIKIR (capital) (2018)

Moldova
491,000 CHISINAU (capital) (2022)

Monaco
39,000 MONACO (capital) (2018)

Mongolia
1.645 million ULAANBAATAR (capital) (2022)

Montenegro
177,000 PODGORICA (capital) (2018)

Morocco
3.893 million Casablanca, 1.959 million RABAT (capital), 1.290 million Fes, 1.314 million Tangier, 1.050 million Marrakech, 979,000 Agadir (2023)

Mozambique
1.797 million Matola ; 1.139 million MAPUTO (capital) ; 927,000 Nampula (2022)

Myanmar (Burma)
5.610 million RANGOON (Yangon) (capital), 1.532 million Mandalay (2023)

Namibia
461,000 WINDHOEK (capital) (2022)

Nepal
1.521 million KATHMANDU (capital) (2022)

Netherlands
2.48 million AMSTERDAM (capital), 2.40 million Rotterdam - The Hague (2022)

New Caledonia
198,000 NOUMEA (capital) (2018)

New Zealand
1.652 million Auckland, 419,000 WELLINGTON (capital) (2022)

Nicaragua
1.095 million MANAGUA (capital) (2023)

Niger
1.384 million NIAMEY (capital) (2022)

Nigeria
15.946 million Lagos, 4.348 million Kano, 3.875 million Ibadan, 3.840 million ABUJA (capital), 3.480 million Port Harcourt, 1.905 million Benin City (2023)

Niue
1,000 ALOFI (capital) (2018)

North Macedonia
606,000 SKOPJE (capital) (2022)

Northern Mariana Islands
51,000 SAIPAN (capital) (2018)

Norway
1.071 million OSLO (capital) (2022)

Oman
1.623 million MUSCAT (capital) (2022)

Pakistan
17.236 million Karachi, 13.979 million Lahore, 3.711 million Faisalabad, 2.415 million Gujranwala, 2.412 million Peshawar, 1.232 million ISLAMABAD (capital) (2023)

Palau
277 NGERULMUD (capital) (2018)

Palestine
756,000 Gaza ; 153,237 RAMALLAH (Capital) (2022)

Panama
1.977 million PANAMA CITY (capital) (2023)

Papua New Guinea
410,000 PORT MORESBY (capital) (2023)

Paraguay
3.511 million ASUNCION (capital) (2023)

Peru
11.204 million LIMA (capital), 959,000 Arequipa, 904,000 Trujillo (2023)

Philippines
14.667 million MANILA (capital), 1.949 million Davao, 1.025 million Cebu City, 931,000 Zamboanga, 960,000 Antipolo, 803,000 Cagayan de Oro City, 803,000 Dasmarinas (2023)

Poland
1.798 million WARSAW (capital), 769,000 Krakow (2023)

Portugal
3.001 million LISBON (capital), 1.325 million Porto (2023)

Puerto Rico
2.440 million SAN JUAN (capital) (2023)

Qatar
779,000 Ar-Rayyan ; 652,000 DOHA (capital) (2022)

Romania
1.785 million BUCHAREST (capital) (2022)

Russia
12.680 million MOSCOW (capital), 5.561 million Saint Petersburg, 1.695 million Novosibirsk, 1.528 million Yekaterinburg, 1.292 million Kazan, 1.251 million Nizhniy Novgorod (2023)

Rwanda
1.208 million KIGALI (capital) (2022)

Saint Helena, Ascension, and Tristan da Cunha
1,000 JAMESTOWN (capital) (2018)

Saint Kitts and Nevis
14,000 BASSETERRE (capital) (2018)

Saint Lucia
22,000 CASTRIES (capital) (2018)

Saint Pierre and Miquelon
6,000 SAINT - PIERRE (capital) (2018)

Saint Vincent and the Grenadines
27,000 KINGSTOWN (capital) (2018)

Samoa
36,000 APIA (capital) (2018)

San Marino
4,000 SAN MARINO (2018)

São Tomé and Príncipe
80,000 SÃO TOMÉ (capital) (2018)

Saudi Arabia
7.682 million RIYADH (capital), 4.863 million Jeddah, 2.150 million Mecca, 1.573 million Medina, 1.329 million Ad Dammam, 872,000 million Hufuf-Mubarraz (2023)

Senegal
3.326 million DAKAR (capital) (2022)

Serbia
1.405 million BELGRADE (capital) (2022)

Seychelles
28,000 VICTORIA (capital) (2018)

Sierra Leone
1.272 million FREETOWN (capital) (2022)

Singapore
6.081 million SINGAPORE (capital) (2023)

Sint Maarten
1,327 PHILIPSBURG (capital) (2011)

Slovakia
439,000 BRATISLAVA (capital) (2022)

Slovenia
286,000 LJUBLJANA (capital) (2018)

Solomon Islands
82,000 HONIARA (capital) (2018)

Somalia
2.610 million MOGADISHU (capital), 1.127 million Hargeysa (2023)

South Africa
10.316 million Johannesburg (includes Ekurhuleni), 4.890 million Cape Town (legislative capital), 3.228 million Durban, 2.818 million PRETORIA (administrative capital), 1.296 million Port Elizabeth, 934,000 West Rand (2023)

South Sudan
459,000 JUBA (capital) (2023)

Spain
6.751 million MADRID (capital), 5.687 million Barcelona, 838,000 Valencia (2023)

Sri Lanka
103,000 Sri Jayewardenepura Kotte (legislative capital) (2018), 633,000 COLOMBO (capital) (2023)

Sudan
6.344 million KHARTOUM (capital), 1.057 million Nyala (2023)

Suriname
239,000 PARAMARIBO (capital) (2018)

Sweden
1.659 million STOCKHOLM (capital) (2022)

Switzerland
1.420 million Zurich, 437,000 BERN (capital) (2022)

Syria
2.585 million DAMASCUS (capital), 2.203 million Aleppo, 1.443 million Hims (Homs), 996,000 Hamah (2023)

Taiwan
4.504 million New Taipei City, 2.754 million TAIPEI (capital), 2.319 million Taoyuan, 1.553 million Kaohsiung, 1.369 million Taichung, 863,000 Tainan (2023)

Tajikistan
962,000 DUSHANBE (capital) (2022)

Tanzania
262,000 Dodoma (legislative capital) (2018), 7.776 million DAR ES SALAAM (administrative capital), 1.311 million Mwanza, 800,000 Zanzibar (2023)

Thailand
10.5 million BANGKOK (capital), 1.2 million Chiang Mai, 450,000 Nakhon Ratchasima, 415,000 Khon Kaen, 

400,000 Hat Yai (2023)

Timor-Leste
281,000 DILI (capital) (2018)

Togo
1.926 million LOME (capital) (2022)

Tonga
23,000 NUKU'ALOFA (2018)

Trinidad and Tobago
545,000 PORT OF SPAIN (capital) (2022)

Tunisia
2.439 million TUNIS (capital) (2022)

Turkey
15.848 million Istanbul, 5.397 million ANKARA (capital), 3.088 million Izmir, 2.086 million Bursa, 1.836 million Adana, 1.805 million Gaziantep (2023)

Turkmenistan
883,000 ASHGABAT (capital) (2022)

Turks and Caicos Islands
5,000 GRAND TURK (capital) (2018)

Tuvalu
7,000 FUNAFUTI (capital) (2018)

Uganda
3.652 million KAMPALA (capital) (2022)

Ukraine
3.010 million KYIV (capital) ; 1.423 million Kharkiv ; 1.008 million Odesa ; 952,000 Dnipro ; 893,000 Donetsk (2022)

United Arab Emirates
2.964 million Dubai ; 1.786 million Sharjah ; 1.540 million ABU DHABI (capital) (2022)

United Kingdom
9.648 million LONDON (capital), 2.791 million Manchester, 2.665 million Birmingham, 1.929 million West Yorkshire, 1.698 million Glasgow, 952,000 Southampton / Portsmouth (2023)

United States
18.937 million New York - Newark, 12.534 million Los Angeles - Long Beach - Santa Ana, 8.937 million Chicago, 6.707 million Houston, 6.574 million Dallas - Fort Worth, 5.490 million WASHINGTON, D.C. (capital) (2023)

Uruguay
1.767 million MONTEVIDEO (capital) (2022)

Uzbekistan
2.574 million TASHKENT (capital) (2022)

Vanuatu
53,000 PORT - VILA (capital) (2018)

Venezuela
2.972 million CARACAS (capital), 2.368 million Maracaibo, 1.983 million Valencia, 1.254 million Barquisimeto, 1.243 million Maracay, 964,000 Ciudad Guayana (2023)

Vietnam
9.321 million Ho Chi Minh City, 5.253 million HANOI (capital), 1.865 million Can Tho, 1.423 million Hai Phong, 1.221 million Da Nang, 1.111 million Bien Hoa (2023)

Virgin Islands
52,000 CHARLOTTE AMALIE (capital) (2018)

Wallis and Futuna
1,000 MATA - UTU (capital) (2018)

Yemen
3.182 million SANAA (capital), 1.045 million Aden (2022)

Zambia
3.042 million LUSAKA (capital) (2022)

Zimbabwe
1.558 million HARARE (capital) (2022)

Very highly urbanized countries 

This is the list of countries where the urbanization rate is at least 80%. Australia, Canada, Japan and the United States are included in the list and are among other very highly urbanized countries.

Definitions
In less-developed countries, in addition to land use and density requirements, a requirement that a large majority of the population, typically 75%, is not engaged in agriculture and/or fishing is sometimes used.

East Asia

China

Since 2000, China's cities have expanded at an average rate of 10% annually. It is estimated that China's urban population will increase by 292 million people by 2050, when its cities will house a combined population of over one billion. The country's urbanization rate increased from 17.4% to 46.6% between 1978 and 2009. Between 150 and 200 million migrant workers work part-time in the major cities, returning home to the countryside periodically with their earnings.

Today, China has more cities with one million or more long-term residents than any other country, including the three global cities of Beijing, Hong Kong, and Shanghai; by 2025, the country will be home to 221 cities with over a million inhabitants. The figures in the table below are from the 2008 census, and are only estimates of the urban populations within administrative city limits; a different ranking exists when considering the total municipal populations (which includes suburban and rural populations). The large "floating populations" of migrant workers make conducting censuses in urban areas difficult; the figures below include only long-term residents.

Japan

South Korea
Seoul is the largest urban area in South Korea.

South Asia

India

For the Census of India 2011, the definition of urban area is a place having a minimum population of 5,000 of density  or higher, and 75% plus of the male working population employed in non-agricultural activities. Places administered by a municipal corporation, cantonment board or notified town area committee are automatically considered urban areas.

The Census of India 2011 also defined the term "urban agglomeration" as an integrated urban area consisting of a core town together with its "outgrowths" (contiguous suburbs).

Pakistan

In Pakistan, an area is a major city and municipality if it has more than 100,000 inhabitants according to census results.
Cities include adjacent cantonments.
Urbanisation in Pakistan has increased since the time of independence and has several different causes. The majority of southern Pakistan's population lives along the Indus River. Karachi is its most populous city. In the northern half of the country, most of the population lives in an arc formed by the cities of Lahore, Faisalabad, Rawalpindi, Islamabad, Gujranwala, Sialkot, Gujrat, Jhelum, Sargodha, Sheikhupura, Nowshera, Mardan and Peshawar. During 1990–2008, city dwellers made up 36% of Pakistan's population, making it the most urbanised nation in South Asia. Furthermore, 50% of Pakistanis live in towns of 5,000 people or more.
Karachi is the most populated city in Pakistan closely followed by Lahore according to the 2017 Census.

Bangladesh
In Bangladesh, there are total 532 urban areas, which are divided into three categories. Those are City Corporation, Municipal Corporation (Pourasova) and Upazila town. Among those urban areas, Dhaka is the largest city by population and area, with a population of 19.10 million. In Bangladesh, there are total 11 City Corporations and 329 Municipal Corporations and 203 Small towns, which serves as the center for Upazilas. According to 2011 population census, Bangladesh has an urban population of 28%, with a growth rate of 2.8%. At this growth rate, it is estimated that the urban population of Bangladesh will reach 79 million or 42% of total population by 2035.

Southeast Asia

Philippines
With an estimated population of 16.3 million, Metro Manila is the most populous metropolitan area in the Philippines and the 11th in the world. However, the greater urban area is the 5th largest in the world with a population of 20,654,307 people (2010 estimate).

Singapore

As an island city-state, about 5.6 million people live and work within . With 64 islands and islets, Singapore Island makes up the largest urban area in the country. According to the United Nations Economic and Social Commission for Asia and the Pacific, the country has the highest urbanised population in Southeast Asia, with 100 percent of its population living in an urban area. The Urban Redevelopment Authority (URA) is responsible for the urban land-use planning, which designates land use and urban density of the country. The country is divided into 5 regions for planning purposes by the URA, even though as a city state Singapore is defined as a single continuous urban area. It is further subdivided into 55 urban planning areas, which acts as the boundaries of planned towns within the country.

Vietnam
In Vietnam, there are 6 types of urban areas:
 Special urban area (2 municipalities): Hanoi and Ho Chi Minh City.
 Type I urban area (18 provincial cities and 3 municipalities): Long Xuyên, Pleiku, Mỹ Tho, Thủ Dầu Một, Bắc Ninh, Biên Hòa, Hải Dương, Thanh Hóa, Hạ Long, Việt Trì, Thái Nguyên, Nam Định, Vũng Tàu, Buôn Ma Thuột, Đà Lạt, Quy Nhơn, Nha Trang, Huế, Vinh, Cần Thơ, Đà Nẵng and Hải Phòng.
 Type II urban area (21 provincial cities and 1 district):Châu Đốc, Đồng Hới, Uông Bí, Bắc Giang, Ninh Bình, Bạc Liêu, Bà Rịa, Thái Bình, Rạch Giá, Cà Mau, Phan Rang–Tháp Chàm, Tuy Hòa, Phan Thiết, Vĩnh Yên, Lào Cai and Phú Quốc.
 Type III urban area (31 provincial cities and 12 towns).
 Type IV urban area (35 towns and 35 townships).
 Type V urban area (586 townships and 54 communes).

Thailand
Bangkok is the largest urban area in Thailand.

Europe

Finland

As in other Nordic countries, an urban area (taajama in Finnish) in Finland must have a building at least every  and at least 200 people. To be considered a town or a city (kaupunki) for statistical purposes, an urban area must have at least 15,000 people. This is not to be confused with the city / town designation used by municipalities.

France

In France, an urban area (Fr: aire d'attraction d'une ville) is a zone encompassing an area of built-up growth (called an "urban unit" (unité urbaine) – close in definition to the North American urban area) and its commuter belt (couronne). Americans would find the INSEE definition of the urban area to be similar to their metropolitan area.

The largest cities in France, in terms of urban area population (2017), are Paris (12,628,266), Lyon (2,323,221), Marseille (1,760,653), Toulouse (1,360,829), Bordeaux (1,247,977), Lille (1,191,117), Nice (1,006,201), Nantes (972,828), Strasbourg (790,087) and Rennes (733,320).

Germany
Germany has a number of large cities. The largest conurbation is the Rhine-Ruhr region (11 million ), including Düsseldorf (the capital of North Rhine-Westphalia), Cologne, Bonn, Dortmund, Essen, Duisburg, and Bochum.

Netherlands
The Netherlands is the 30th most densely populated country in the world, with —or  if only the land area is counted. The Randstad is the country's largest conurbation located in the west of the country and contains the four largest cities: Amsterdam, Rotterdam, The Hague, and Utrecht. The Randstad has a population of 7 million inhabitants and is the 6th largest metropolitan area in Europe.

Sweden

Urban areas in Sweden (tätorter) are statistically defined localities, totally independent of the administrative subdivision of the country. There are 1,956 such localities in Sweden, with a population ranging from 200 to 1,372,000 inhabitants.

United Kingdom

In 2013 the United Kingdom's Office for National Statistics (ONS) published 2011 Built-up Areas - Methodology and Guidance which sets out its definition of a built-up area as an area of built-up land of at least , separated from other settlements by at least . For 2011 census data there are 5,493 built-up areas, of which 501 are divided into sub-divisions for which data is also available. Each built-up area is named algorithmically, using Ordnance Survey place-name data.

The ONS has produced census results from urban areas since 1951, since 1981 based upon the extent of irreversible urban development indicated on Ordnance Survey maps. The definition is an extent of at least 20 ha and at least 1,500 census residents. Separate areas are linked if less than 200 m (220 yd) apart. Included are transportation features. The UK has five Urban Areas with a population over a million and a further sixty nine with a population over one hundred thousand.

Norway

Statistics Norway defines urban areas ("tettsteder") similarly to the other Nordic countries. Unlike in Denmark and Sweden, the distance between each building has to be of less than 50 m, although exceptions are made due to parks, industrial areas, rivers, and similar. Groups of houses less than 400 m from the main body of an urban area are included in the urban area.

Poland
In Poland, official "urban" population figures simply refer to those localities which have the status of towns (miasta). The "rural" population is that of all areas outside the boundaries of these towns. This distinction may give a misleading impression in some cases, since some localities with only village status may have acquired larger and denser populations than many many smaller towns with most excessive example of Poznań, most spread urban area of the country with population of the city app. 534 thousand and urban area above 1,100 thousand inhabitants. On the other hand, the Upper Silesian Industrial Region conurbation with numerous large and medium cities covers 3,200 km and has approximately 3 million people.

Russia
Moscow, the capital and largest city of Russia, has a population estimated at 12.4 million residents within the city limits, while over 17 million residents in the urban area, and over 20 million residents in the Moscow Metropolitan Area. It is among the world's largest cities, being the most populous city entirely within Europe, the most populous urban area in Europe, the most populous metropolitan area in Europe, and also the largest city by land area on the European continent. Saint Petersburg, the cultural capital, is the second-largest city, with a population of roughly 5.4 million inhabitants. Other major urban areas are Yekaterinburg, Novosibirsk, Kazan, Nizhny Novgorod, and Chelyabinsk.

Oceania

Australia
The Australian Bureau of Statistics refers to urban areas as Urban Centres, which it generally defines as population clusters of 1,000 or more people. Australia is one of the most urbanised countries in the world, with more than 50% of the population residing in Australia's three biggest urban centres.

<noinclude>

New Zealand

Statistics New Zealand defines urban areas in New Zealand, which are independent of any administrative subdivisions and have no legal basis. There are four classes of urban area: major urban areas (population 100,000+), large urban areas (population 30,000-99,999), medium urban areas (population 10,000-29,999) and small urban areas (population 1000-9,999). As of 2021, there are 7 major urban areas, 13 large urban areas, 22 medium urban areas and 136 small urban areas. Urban areas are reclassified after each New Zealand census, so population changes between censuses does not change an urban area's classification.

North America

Canada

If two or more urban areas are within  of each other by road, they are merged into a single urban area, provided they do not cross census metropolitan area or census agglomeration boundaries.

In the Canada 2011 Census, Statistics Canada redesignated urban areas with the new term "population centre"; the new term was chosen in order to better reflect the fact that urban vs. rural is not a strict division, but rather a continuum within which several distinct settlement patterns may exist. For example, a community may fit a strictly statistical definition of an urban area, but may not be commonly thought of as "urban" because it has a smaller population, or functions socially and economically as a suburb of another urban area rather than as a self-contained urban entity, or is geographically remote from other urban communities. Accordingly, the new definition set out three distinct types of population centres: small (population 1,000 to 29,999), medium (population 30,000 to 99,999) and large (population 100,000 or greater). Despite the change in terminology, however, the demographic definition of a population centre remains unchanged from that of an urban area: a population of at least 1,000 people where the density is no fewer than 400 persons per km2.

Mexico
Mexico is one of many countries where the urbanization rate is at least 80%. Mexico City, its capital, is the largest urban area in the country.

United States

In the United States, the Census Bureau defines urban areas and delineates urban area boundaries after each census. The Bureau defines an urban area as "a statistical geographic entity consisting of a densely settled core created from census blocks and contiguous qualifying territory that together have at least 2,000 housing units or 5,000 persons." There were 2,646 urban areas identified by the Census Bureau for 2020. 511 of these had a population of 50,000 or more.

For the 2000 and 2010 censuses, the Census Bureau differentiated between two kinds of urban areas: urbanized areas and urban clusters. The term urbanized area denoted an urban area of 50,000 or more people. Urban areas under 50,000 people were called urban clusters. Urbanized areas were first delineated in the United States in the 1950 census, while urban clusters were added in the 2000 census. The distinction between urbanized areas and urban clusters was removed for the 2020 census.

Urban areas consist of a densely-settled urban core, plus surrounding developed areas that meet certain density criteria. Since urban areas are composed of census blocks and not cities, counties, or county-equivalents, urban area boundaries may consist of partial areas of these political units. Urban areas are distinguished from rural areas: any area not part of an urban area is considered to be rural by the Census Bureau.

The largest urban area in the United States is that of New York City and its surrounding suburbs. The New York–Jersey City–Newark, NY–NJ urban area had a population of 19,426,449 as of 2020, while the larger metropolitan area had a population of 20,140,470, and the combined statistical area had a population of 23,582,649. The next five largest urban areas in the U.S. are those of Los Angeles, Chicago, Miami, Houston, and Dallas. 80.0 percent of the population of the United States lives within the boundaries of an urban area as of the 2020 census. 

The concept of Urbanized Areas as defined by the U.S. Census Bureau is often used as a more accurate gauge of the size of a city, since in different cities and states the lines between city borders and the urbanized area of that city are often not the same. For example, the city of Greenville, South Carolina has a city population just over 68,000 and an urbanized area population of around 400,000, while Greensboro, North Carolina has a city population just over 285,000 and an urbanized area population of around 300,000 — meaning that Greenville is actually "larger" for some intents and purposes, but not for others, such as taxation, local elections, etc.

In the U.S. Department of Agriculture's natural resources inventory, urban areas are officially known as developed areas or urban and built-up areas. Such areas include cities, ethnic villages, other built-up areas of more than 10 ac (4 ha), industrial sites, railroad yards, cemeteries, airports, golf courses, shooting ranges, institutional and public administration sites, and similar areas. The 1997 national resources inventory placed over 98,000,000 ac (40,000,000 ha) in this category, an increase of 25,000,000 ac (10,000,000 ha) since 1982.

South America

Argentina
Argentina is highly urbanized. The ten largest metropolitan areas account for half of the population, and fewer than one in ten live in rural areas. About 3 million people live in Buenos Aires City and the Greater Buenos Aires metropolitan area totals around 15 million, making it one of the largest urban areas in the world, with a population of 18 million all up.

Córdoba has around 1.5 million people living in the urban area, while Rosario, Mendoza and Tucumán have around 1.2 million inhabitants each and La Plata, Mar del Plata, Salta and Santa Fe have at least 500,000 people each.

Brazil

Chile
Chile is highly urbanized, just like Argentina. The largest urban area in the country is its capital, Santiago.

See also

 Developed environments
 Urban climatology
 Urban culture
 Urban decay
 Urban exploration
 Urban planning
 Urban renewal
 Urbanization
 Urban vitality
 Surface sealing

References

External links
 United Nations Statistics Division (UNSTAT): Definition of "urban"
 World Urban Areas All identified world urbanized areas 500,000+ and others: Population & Density.
 Geopolis: research group, University of Paris-Diderot, France for world urban areas
 Gridded Population of the World – contains links to urban area definitions and maps for over 230 countries/territories
 City Mayors – The World's Largest Urban Areas in 2006
 City Mayors – The World's Largest Urban Areas Projected for 2020
 PopulationData – World's largest urban areas 1,000,000+ population

 
Urban design
Urban planning